Anthony Omar Cuff (born September 24, 1984) is a former American football running back. He was signed by the Tennessee Titans as an undrafted free agent in 2008. He played college football at Delaware.

Omar Cuff was on the practice squads of Cleveland Browns, Kansas City Chiefs, Tampa Bay Buccaneers and New England Patriots.

External links
Delaware Fightin' Blue Hens football Bio
New England Patriots bio

Further reading

1984 births
Living people
Players of American football from Maryland
American football running backs
Delaware Fightin' Blue Hens football players
Tennessee Titans players
Cleveland Browns players
Kansas City Chiefs players
Tampa Bay Buccaneers players
New England Patriots players